Royal Roads Military College (RRMC) was a Canadian military college from 1940 to 1995, located in Hatley Park, Colwood, British Columbia, near Victoria, British Columbia, Canada.

The facility now serves as the campus of Royal Roads University, a public university that offers applied and professional academic programs on-campus and via distance education.

The campus' centrepiece is Hatley Castle, which was erected by architect Samuel Maclure in the early 20th century for British Columbia coal magnate James Dunsmuir and his wife, Laura.

History

The property owned by industrialist James Dunsmuir, along with his mansion Hatley Castle, was acquired by the Dominion Government in 1940. The initial plan was that the site would be used to house the British royal family during World War II. However, as the Queen Mother put it, "The children will not go without me and I will not go without the King and the King will never go".

Designed to support Canada's naval war effort, the facility began operating in December 1940 as an officer training establishment known as HMCS Royal Roads (named after the Royal Roads naval anchorage). Many of the 600 volunteer reserve officers who underwent training during this time served in the Battle of the Atlantic. HMCS Royal Roads was used to train short-term probationary Royal Canadian Navy Volunteer Reserve (RCNVR) sub-lieutenants to serve in World War II.

In 1942, because of wartime expansion, the Royal Canadian Naval College was established. In 1947, the facility became known as the RCN-RCAF Joint Services College where Royal Canadian Navy and Royal Canadian Air Force personnel were trained. The facility changed its name to Canadian Services College, Royal Roads in 1948 where personnel from all three services - the Navy, Air Force, and Army were trained during a two-year program.

In 1968 the college's name was changed to Royal Roads Military College, and in 1975, the college began granting degrees.

The gentlemen cadets of RRMC were not only required to excel in their respective academic fields, but to achieve the standard in the three other components as well, the Second Language Training component, Physical Fitness component and the Military component. Failure in any of these four components resulted in the officer cadet not being awarded the coveted RRMC degree.

In February 1994, after the end of the Cold War and under the pressure of massive spending cuts from the Government of Canada, the Department of National Defence announced that it would close Royal Roads Military College. The final class graduated in May 1995.

Hatley Park and former Royal Roads Military College was declared a National Historic Site of Canada in 1995 to commemorate the Dunsmuir family (1908–1937) and RRMC (1940–1995). The site was plaqued in 2000 as a Canadian example of an Edwardian park, with gardens, which remains practically intact.

The name Royal Roads was drawn from geography. The name refers to an anchorage located in Juan de Fuca Strait between the city of Victoria, British Columbia and Albert Bay. HMCS Royal Roads was located on a property originally purchased by James Dunsmuir in 1902. Dunsmuir was a former British Columbian premier and lieutenant governor. The Hatley Park Estate originally comprised . The Dunsmuir family added Hatley Castle, which was completed in 1908. The Canadian Department of National Defence purchased Hatley Park, almost in its entirety, in 1940, for $75,000. This sum was roughly the value of the fence surrounding the property.

As Executive Officer, Commander Reginald Amand (Jumbo) Webber D.S.C., C.D. served there till late 1942. On June 21, 1995, after negotiations with the Department of National Defence and the Government of British Columbia, the British Columbia government passed the Royal Roads University Act, creating Royal Roads University. The campus is currently leased from the federal government under a $1, 50-year lease agreement with Royal Roads University which was announced in 2001. The Department of National Defence leases approximately 55 hectares of land for the campus to Royal Roads University, and has entered into a five-year Renewable Management Agreement with the University for the maintenance of the remaining 175 hectares of property owned by the Department of National Defence.

The athletic facilities at Hatley Park included a swimming pool, five tennis courts, two squash courts, three soccer pitches, one rugby field, two ball diamonds, a quarter- mile track, a 6.1 km cross country course, jetty and boat house. Cadets played sports including rugby, soccer, baseball, golf, scuba diving, track and field, wrestling, ball hockey, broomball, and ice hockey.

Squadrons of the Cadet Wing

The undergraduate student body, known as the Cadet Wing, was sub-divided into four smaller groupings called squadrons, under the guidance and supervision of senior cadets. Until the late 70's the four squadrons were populated by undergraduate cadets. When the college started training NCMs it was reorganized so that the first three squadrons were for cadets while 4 Squadron was for mature students from the University Training Program Non-Commissioned Members program. Although squadrons were not named, they were represented by embroidered patches bearing mythological figures, which were worn on the sleeves of the cadet workdress. The squadrons were subdivided into flights, which were named after historical figures (explorers). Cadets competed by squadron in drill and intramurals.

Band

By 1955, Royal Roads had a drum and bugle corps. The Brass and Reed Band had already been formed by 1975. WO George Dunn, the first full-time Bandmaster, served from 1975 to 1979. The Pipes and Drums performed at parades, public relation trips and recruit shows. The Pipe Section and the Drum Section performed at mess dinners; parades; sporting events; ceremonies (official or squadron); weddings; funerals; public relations; wing events; Christmas and Graduation Balls; private events; and holidays.

Notable historical milestones

Facilities 
The Register of the Government of Canada Heritage Buildings lists 9 recognized buildings and 1 classified building on the former grounds of the Royal Roads Military College.

Other buildings

Royal Roads Military College Museum

Hatley Castle is home to the Royal Roads Military College Museum.

The museum is located in Hatley Castle, on the campus of the Royal Roads University and former campus of the Royal Roads Military College of Canada. The Museum mandate is to collect, conserve, research and display material relating to the history of the Royal Roads Military College, its former cadets and its site.

The Royal Roads Military College Museum is a member of the Canadian Museums Association and the Organization of Military Museums of Canada Inc. The Royal Roads Museum is an accredited museum within the Canadian Forces Museum System.

The museum has formed a cooperating association of friends of the museum to assist with projects.

Traditions

Commandants

Principals

Notable professors

Notable alumni

Quotes

Filming location
The campus of Royal Roads has been used as a film set for:
 Professor Xavier's School for Gifted Youngsters in the "X-Men (film)" movies.
 The Luthor Mansion, the estate belonging to Lex Luthor in TV series Smallville
 The Shady Glen School in the 1997 movie, Masterminds
 The hideout in MacGyver, season 5, "The Legend of the Holy Rose, part 2"
 The home for the Royal Family in the Seven Days TV series, episode 9, season 2, "Love and Other Disasters"
 Little Women, starring Winona Ryder (1994)
 The Changeling, starring George C. Scott (1979)
 The Queen mansion in the CW series "The Arrow" (2012)

Books

 Doug Cope "The Roadants" (Royal Roads Military College, Victoria, BC 2013)
 Peter J.S. Dunnett & W. Kim Rempel Royal Roads Military College 1940-1990, A Pictorial Retrospective (Royal Roads Military College, Victoria, BC 1990)
 Maurice Robinson, Bev Hall, Paul Price Royal Roads : a celebration (Natural Light Productions, Victoria, BC, 1995)
 "Royal Roads - a public university with a difference" : a proposal prepared by Hatley Educational Society for presentation to the Advisory Panel on the Future of Royal Roads (Hatley Educational Society, British Columbia 1995)

See also 

 Royal Military College of Canada
 Royal Military College Saint-Jean
 The Canadian Crown and the Canadian Forces
 Monarchy in British Columbia
 Royal Roads University
 Canadian Military Colleges

References

Royal Roads University Archives Digitizes Royal Roads Cadet Yearbooks 1943-95
Karen Inkster 'The best two years...: Narratives of Royal Roads Military College (RRMC) Ex-cadets (1940–1995)' at the Military and Oral History Conference: Between Memory and History on May 7, 2010, Victoria University, British Columbia.
Karen Inkster 'Coming Full Circle: Remembrances of Royal Roads Ex-Cadets' DVD documentary Victoria, British Columbia

External links

 "Military and Staff Colleges" in The Canadian Encyclopedia
 Cadet Life at Royal Roads Military College: The Log yearbooks from 1943 to 1995
 Hatley Castle
 Stay in School, National Film Board of Canada (1964) Documentary about high school students who tour Royal Roads

1940 establishments in British Columbia
1995 disestablishments in British Columbia
Educational institutions established in 1940
Educational institutions disestablished in 1995
Education in Victoria, British Columbia
Naval academies
Defunct Canadian military colleges
Military history of Canada
Organizations based in Canada with royal patronage
Royal Canadian Navy
Royal Roads University